Tel Adashim (lit. Lentils Hill) is a moshav in northern Israel. Located between Nazareth and Afula, it falls under the jurisdiction of Jezreel Valley Regional Council.

History

Arab and Jewish villages
Jewish settlement began in the area in 1913 when Hashomer established Tel Adash, a settlement whose purpose was to protect the oil pipeline from Iraq to Haifa. By 1918, only two families remained.

In 1921 Zionist activists completed a purchase of 22,000 dunams at Tell el-Adas from the Sursuk family of Beirut. At that time, there were 150 Muslim families living there.

In the 1922 census of Palestine, conducted by the British Mandate authorities, Tal Adas had a population of 118; 98 Muslims, 16 Jews and 4 Christians.

1923 moshav
In 1923, a moshav ovdim was established on the site and was named Tel Adashim.

Notable residents
Notable past and present residents include Rafael Eitan, Yigal Cohen, A. D. Gordon and Alexander Zaïd.

References

External links
Official website
Moshav Tel Adashim Collection on the Digital collections of Younes and Soraya Nazarian Library, University of Haifa

Moshavim
Populated places established in 1923
Populated places in Northern District (Israel)
1923 establishments in Mandatory Palestine